Multi-particle collision dynamics (MPC), also known as stochastic rotation dynamics (SRD), is a particle-based mesoscale simulation technique for complex fluids which fully incorporates thermal fluctuations and hydrodynamic interactions. Coupling of embedded particles to the coarse-grained solvent is achieved through molecular dynamics.

Method of simulation
The solvent is modelled as a set of  point particles of mass  with continuous coordinates  and velocities . The simulation consists of streaming and collision steps.

During the streaming step, the coordinates of the particles are updated according to

where  is a chosen simulation time step which is typically much larger than a molecular dynamics time step.

After the streaming step, interactions between the solvent particles are modelled in the collision step. The particles are sorted into collision cells with a lateral size . Particle velocities within each cell are updated according to the collision rule

In three dimensions, the rotation is performed by an angle  around a random rotation axis. The same rotation is applied for all particles within a given collision cell, but the direction (axis) of rotation is statistically independent both between all cells and for a given cell in time.

If the structure of the collision grid defined by the positions of the collision cells is fixed, Galilean invariance is violated. It is restored with the introduction of a random shift of the collision grid.

Explicit expressions for the diffusion coefficient and viscosity derived based on Green-Kubo relations are in excellent agreement with simulations.

Simulation parameters
The set of parameters for the simulation of the solvent are:
 solvent particle mass 
 average number of solvent particles per collision box 
 lateral collision box size 
 stochastic rotation angle 
 kT (energy)
 time step 

The simulation parameters define the solvent properties, such as

 mean free path 
 diffusion coefficient 
 shear viscosity 
 thermal diffusivity 

where  is the dimensionality of the system.

Applications
MPC has become a notable tool in the simulations of many soft-matter systems, including
 colloid dynamics
 polymer dynamics
 vesicles
 active systems
 liquid crystals

References

Computational fluid dynamics